Raphaël Bohren (born 15 May 1984 in Port-au-Prince, Haiti) is a Swiss figure skater. He is the 2003 Swiss national silver medalist and the 2006 national bronze medalist.

External links
 

1984 births
Living people
Swiss male single skaters